Battle of Jammu was a battle fought on 27 February 1399. Timur invasion India

See also 

 Battle of the Kondurcha River
 Siege of Damascus (1400)
 Battle of Tarian
 Battle of Dewair (1606)
 Battle of Ankara

References 

History of Kashmir
Battles involving the Timurid Empire
Jammu